The Luehdorfiini are a tribe of swallowtail butterflies.

Genera
The tribe is thought to consist of three genera:

 Archon
 Doritites
 Luehdorfia

References
 Nazari et al. (2007) Phylogeny, historical biogeography, and taxonomic ranking of Parnassiinae (Lepidoptera, Papilionidae) based on morphology and seven genes. Molecular Phylogenetics and Evolution. 42(1):131–156. PDF

External links
 

Papilionidae
Butterfly tribes